Oleg Valjalo (born 19 November 1970, Dubrovnik) is a Croatian politician who served as a Croatian member of the European Parliament from the accession of Croatia to the European Union on 1 July 2013 until 1 July 2014. He was placed on the European Parliament Committee on Budgets during his term. He is a member of the Social Democratic Party of Croatia.

He has an MA in economics and has worked in banking and tourism.

References

External links
 

1970 births
Living people
People from Dubrovnik
Social Democratic Party of Croatia politicians
MEPs for Croatia 2013–2014